The village of Maddoke is situated between  the cities of Moga and Jagraon, India, on an Ajitwal-Badhni link road which is 7 km. from Ajitwal. The sixth Sikh Guru, Siri Guru Hargobind Sahib visited this historical village. In the memory of Siri Guru Hargobind Sahib, a five story beautiful building has been constructed.

An English medium school is run by Gurudwara Committee. This school was started in 1984 with the aim and object to impart Primary and Secondary education to the students preparing them for high class universities and colleges. There are currently over 1500 students enrolled which come from various villages around Maddoke.

About Maddoke 
Population (1991 Census): 2380
Area: 570 Hectares
Tehsil and District: Moga
Pin Code: 142053
Nearest Highway: Ludhiana-Ferozepur 7 km, Moga-Barnala 5 km
Nearest Railway: Station Ajitwal 7 km
Location On Globe (Not Valid For Navigation)
Latitude 30.852
Longitude 75.328
Elevation 234 from Sea Level

Origin of Maddoke 
The modern village of Maddoke was settled in the late nineties of 1600 and was settled by the efforts Dharm Singh from village Dhudike. Jhanda Singh and Dharm Singh were sons of Gurdas Singh from Dhudike. Jhanda Singh settled in "Jhandyiana" and that village is named after his name. Dharm Singh came to Maddoke and this village wasn't named after his name because there was already an old well and the place was called Madhoke. So the conclusion is: The name Maddoke is given by either Sant Madho Das or "Maddo Kaler", but the village Maddoke is settled by Dharam Singh.

History of People Belonging to Different Last Names in Maddoke 
The Gill's belonging to Bhan Singh, Biram Singh, Fateh Singh and Diya Singh came from village Dhudike.
The Gill's belonging to Kapoor Singh came from village Dala.
Families belonging to Atma Ram Mahanat belong to Gill's from Moga, but they came from a village near Patti (Amritsar).
The Sekhon's came from a village called Bohar walla.
The Dhaliwal's and Bhangu's came from village Mallah(Ludhiana).
The Maan's came from village Maan.
The Sran's came from Pathrala.
The Sidhu's came from Baso ke in Doaba.
The Sivyia's came from village Sivyia near Sodiwalla.
Families belonging to Inder Singh Gill came from village Gholyia.

References 

Moga, Punjab
Villages in Moga district